The Museum of Contemporary Art Andros is a museum located in Andros, Greece.

History
The museum was founded in 1979 by Basil and Elisa Goulandris as a venue in which international exhibitions could be housed. The building was designed by architect Stamos Papadakis and the exterior areas were designed by Miranda Spiliotopoulou-Vazaka.

In 1990 the building was represented in the International Garden and Greenery Exposition competition in Osaka, Japan.

Collection
The museum houses more than 300 paintings by Greek artists such as Takis, Chryssa, Fassianos, Kounellis, Psychopedis and Tetsis, and international artists such as Auguste Rodin, and Paul Delvaux.

External links
Official website
Basil & Elise Goulandris Foundation
www.greeka.com

Buildings and structures in Andros
1979 establishments in Greece
Art museums established in 1979
Museums in the South Aegean
Modern art museums in Greece
Goulandris family
Andros